Iruvudellava Bittu is a 2018 Indian Kannada-language Drama movie directed by Kantha Kannalli, who did his debut in the Kannada Film industry as independent director in 2017 through Jalsa  and produced by Devraj Davanagere, featuring Meghana Raj, Tilak Shekar, Achyuth Kumar, Shri Mahadev and Sundeep Malani. The soundtrack and score is composed by Sridhar V. Sambhram, known for super hit music albums Mussanjemaatu and Krishnan Love Story, William David has worked as DOP who is famous for his great work in Rangitharanga and Rajaratha. And Raajakumara fame K. M. Prakash edited the movie. Meghana Raj has won the Karnataka State Film Award for Best Actress for her performance as "Poorvi" for this Kannada movie in 2018.

Plot 
A most intelligent and courageous girl, Poorvi (Meghana Raj) is brought up in sophisticated environment is more inclined towards the corporate lifestyle and as per her wish, having decided to stay away from all her relatives/ close ones. She is in a live-in relationship with  Dev (Tilak Shekar) as per her choice, but with her own ego, self-conceit she is unable to lead a happy life. Eventually, she gets separated from Dev (Tilak Shekar) during pregnancy. After a few years, Due to her imprudent decision when she was about to give up her life, Akash (Shri Mahadev), while saving her on the road meets with an accident, she decides to save him and indirectly saves herself. Later, inspired by the Akash's lifestyle, will she change her mind to lead a beautiful life again? Will she able to set right her family again? Will she get back to her parents who loved her the most ? Will she get back to her love, Dev again? Or will she get settled with Akash, who inspired her to change her mind? This is the curious journey of movie.

Cast 
 Meghana Raj as Poorvi
 Tilak Shekar as Dev
 Achyuth Kumar as Poorvi's father
 Shri Mahadev as Aakash
 Aruna Balraj as Poorvi's mother
 Sundeep Malani as

Production 
Iruvudellava Bittu, which has been made under Devaraj Davanagere newly launched banner Bilwa Creations, has Sridhar V. Sambhram's music, William David's cinematography and K. M. Prakash's editing. Pavan Ranadheera was the creative head for this film.

Soundtrack
Sridhar V. Sambhram has been signed to compose the score and songs for the film. The lyrics for the songs were written by V. Nagendra Prasad, Kaviraj, Kantha Kannalli and Jayanth Kaikini.

Awards
 2018: Karnataka State Film Award for Best Actress
 2019: Nominated – Filmfare Award for Best Actress – Kannada 
 2019: Nominated – Filmibeat Award for Best Actress – Kannada

References

External links
 
 

2010s Kannada-language films